Matthew Torres (born March 27, 2001) is an American Paralympic swimmer who represented the United States at the 2020 Summer Paralympics.

Career
He represented the United States in the men's 400 metre freestyle S8 event at the 2020 Summer Paralympics and won a bronze medal.

On April 14, 2022, Torres was named to the roster to represent the United States at the 2022 World Para Swimming Championships.

References

2001 births
Living people
American disabled sportspeople
American male freestyle swimmers
Paralympic swimmers of the United States
Paralympic bronze medalists for the United States
Paralympic medalists in swimming
Swimmers at the 2020 Summer Paralympics
Medalists at the 2020 Summer Paralympics
Medalists at the 2019 Parapan American Games
Medalists at the World Para Swimming Championships
Sportspeople from Norwalk, Connecticut
Swimmers from Connecticut
American male backstroke swimmers
S8-classified Paralympic swimmers
21st-century American people